Carnuntum ( according to Ptolemy) was a Roman legionary fortress and headquarters of the Pannonian fleet from 50 AD. After the 1st century, it was capital of the Pannonia Superior province. It also became a large city of 50,000 inhabitants.

Its impressive remains are situated on the Danube in Lower Austria halfway between Vienna and Bratislava in the Carnuntum Archaeological Park extending over an area of 10 km2 near today's villages of Petronell-Carnuntum and Bad Deutsch-Altenburg.

History

Military history
Carnuntum first occurs in history during the reign of Augustus (6 AD), when Tiberius made it his base of operations as a Roman fort in the campaigns against Maroboduus (Marbod).

Legio XV 
Significant Romanisation happened when the town was selected as the garrison of the Legio XV  before 14 AD. A few years later, it became the centre of the Roman fortifications along the Danube from Vindobona (now Vienna) to Brigetio (Ó-Szőny). According to Tacitus, the emperor Claudius ordered the governor of Pannonia "to have a legion with an auxiliary on the bank of the Danube" to protect the losers of a dispute between Germanic tribes (the Quadi and Marcomanni) and deter the victors from the temptation to invade Pannonia. To this period (about 50 AD) belongs the auxiliary  of a cavalry  1.5 km south-west of the legionary fortress.

In 71 AD, after several campaigns, the Legio XV Apollinaris returned to Carnuntum and rebuilt its fortress. While some of the legion fought in Trajan's Dacian Wars, the main body of the legion remained in Pannonia.

Legio X 
Legio X  was sent to Carnuntum for a few years from about 63 AD. During the brief reign of Galba (68–69), it was transferred back to Hispania.

Legio VII 
Legio VII , newly founded by Galba in 68 AD, was allocated to Carnuntum until about 71 AD after his defeat by Vespasian.

Legio XIV 
In 117–118 AD, Carnuntum became the permanent quarters of Legio XIV  where it stayed for three centuries until the frontier collapsed in 430.

History of the city
In Roman times, Carnuntum had a history as a major trading centre for amber, brought from the north to traders who sold it in Italy; the main arm of the Amber Road crossed the Danube at Carnuntum.

Its importance is indicated by the fact that Marcus Aurelius resided there for three years (172–175) during the war against the Marcomanni, and wrote part of his Meditations there. Also Septimius Severus, at the time governor of Pannonia, was proclaimed emperor there by his soldiers (193), to replace Emperor Pertinax, who had been murdered.

In the Severan dynasty (193–235), Carnuntum experienced an economic boom, the  reaching their maximum size. He was killed shortly afterwards by his own soldiers, probably at Carnuntum.

In 308, during the Civil wars of the Tetrarchy, the Emperor emeritus Diocletian chaired a historic meeting there, the Conference of Carnuntum, with his co-emperors Maximian and Galerius, to solve the rising tensions within the tetrarchy.

Around 350 Carnuntum suffered severe earthquake damage.

In 374, it was destroyed by Germanic invaders, the Quadi and Iazyges. Although partly restored by Valentinian I, it never regained its former importance, and Vindobona became the chief military centre. During the Barbarian Invasions, Carnuntum was eventually abandoned and used as a cemetery and source of building material for building projects elsewhere. Eventually, its remains became buried and forgotten.

Today
The Archaeological Park Carnuntum comprises three sites:
Museum, Heidentor and amphitheatre near Petronell
Excavations in the garden of Petronell Castle
Museum Carnuntinum

Civilian city

The remains of the civilian city extend around the village Petronell-Carnuntum. There are several places to see in the city: Roman city quarter in the open-air museum, palace ruins, amphitheatre, and Heidentor.

The Roman city ruins are exposed in the open-air museum directly in the present village. One of the ancient houses, called the House of Lucius, has been rebuilt using traditional techniques. It was opened to the public on 1 June 2006.

The  was next to the palace ruins, also referred to as the large public baths.

Some way outside the city was a large amphitheatre, which had room for about 15,000 spectators.
A plate with an inscription found at the site claims that this building was the fourth largest amphitheatre in the whole Roman Empire.

Heidentor
Between 354 AD and 361 AD, a huge triumphal monument was erected next to the camp and city. Contemporary reports suggest that Emperor Constantius II had it built to commemorate his victories. When the remains of Carnuntum disappeared after the Migration Period the monument remained as an isolated building in a natural landscape and led Medieval people to believe it was the tomb of a pagan giant. Hence, they called it  ('Heathens' Gate' or 'Pagans' Gate').

Fortress

The only remaining building of the fortress is an amphitheatre, located just outside the fortress. Today, a small adjacent museum shows the history of gladiators.

Gladiator school
This approach of aerial photography and modern remote sensing has allowed for a detailed virtual recreation of the gladiator school. The aerial photographs used in the recreation were acquired with a radio-controlled Microdrone md4-1000 quadrocopter, which captured a sufficient number of photographs to create an overlap among them. Then, using a technique called structure from motion (SfM), a 3D model of the school was calculated using the sharpest images.
The school, along with the amphitheater, was located outside of the town's walls.  The school had training grounds, bathing facilities, an assembly hall and dormitories for the gladiators. The school also had a courtyard which housed a training area for gladiators. The school was attached to an open campus which was most likely used for chariot races.

Museum Carnuntinum

The archaeological museum Carnuntinum, which is situated in the village of Bad Deutsch-Altenburg on the river Danube, exhibits important archeological finds from the ancient city.

In fiction
Völkisch author Guido von List was so impressed with the ruins that he based his first novel, Carnuntum, on the subject. Another novel, Household Gods, by Harry Turtledove and Judith Tarr, is set in Carnuntum during the reign of Marcus Aurelius, from the point of view of a modern American time traveler.

In Frank Tallis's crime novel Vienna Blood, both Guido von List and his novel Carnuntum appear, together with an eponymous opera based on the novel.

Gallery

References

External links

Archaeological Park Carnuntum

6 establishments
0s establishments in the Roman Empire
374 disestablishments
370s disestablishments in the Roman Empire
Populated places established in the 1st century
Populated places disestablished in the 4th century
Roman towns and cities in Austria
Archaeological sites in Austria
Former populated places in Austria
Geography of Lower Austria
Buildings and structures in Lower Austria
Archaeological parks
Roman amphitheatres
Roman legionary fortresses in Austria
Roman fortifications in Pannonia Superior
Tiberius
Quadi
Populated places in Pannonia